Milisav, is a Slavic masculine given name. Notable people with the name include:

 Milisav Koljenšić (1912–1963), Montenegrin major general
 Milisav Petronijević (born 1949), Serbian politician
 Milisav Popović (born 1978), Montenegrin author
 Milisav Savić (born 1945), Serbian writer and novelist
 Milisav Sećković (born 1973), Montenegrin footballer

Montenegrin masculine given names
Serbian masculine given names